The 2016 Settimana Internazionale di Coppi e Bartali is the 31st edition of the Settimana Internazionale di Coppi e Bartali cycling stage race. It started on 24 March in Gatteo and will end on 27 March in Pavullo.

Schedule
Like the previous two editions, the 2016 race has four days of racing. The first of this is a split stage, with a road stage followed by a team time trial the same day. The following three days each had one stage.

Teams
A total of 25 teams took part to the race

UCI WorldTeams

UCI Professional Continental Teams

UCI Continental teams

GM Europa Ovini

National Teams
Italy

Classifications leadership table

References

Settimana
Settimana
Settimana Internazionale di Coppi e Bartali